Fluvial terraces are elongated terraces that flank the sides of floodplains and fluvial valleys all over the world. They consist of a relatively level strip of land, called a "tread", separated from either an adjacent floodplain, other fluvial terraces, or uplands by distinctly steeper strips of land called "risers". These terraces lie parallel to and above the river channel and its floodplain. Because of the manner in which they form, fluvial terraces are underlain by fluvial sediments of highly variable thickness.
River terraces are the remnants of earlier floodplains that existed at a time when either a stream or river was flowing at a higher elevation before its channel downcut to create a new floodplain at a lower elevation. Changes in elevation can be due to changes in the base level (elevation of the lowest point in the fluvial system, usually the drainage basin) of the fluvial system, which leads to headward erosion along the length of either a stream or river, gradually lowering its elevation. For example, downcutting by a river can lead to increased velocity of a tributary, causing that tributary to erode toward its headwaters. Terraces can also be left behind when the volume of the fluvial flow declines due to changes in climate, typical of areas which were covered by ice during periods of glaciation, and their adjacent drainage basins.

Types
There are two basic types of fluvial terraces, fill terraces and strath terraces. Fill terraces sometimes are further subdivided into nested fill terraces and cut terraces. Both fill and strath terraces are, at times, described as being either paired or unpaired terraces based upon the relative elevations of the surface of these terraces.

Fill terraces: Fill terraces are the result of an existing valley being filled with alluvium.  The valley may fill with alluvium for many different reasons including: an influx in bed load due to glaciation or change in stream power which causes the valley, that was down cut by either a stream or river, to be filled in with material (Easterbrook).  The stream or river will continue to deposit material until an equilibrium is reached and it can transport the material rather than deposit it.  This equilibrium may last for a very short period, such as, after glaciation, or for a very long time if the conditions do not change.  The fill terrace is created when the conditions change again and either a stream or river starts to incise into the material that it deposited in the valley. Once this occurs benches composed completely of alluvium form on the sides of the valley.  The upper most benches are the fill terraces.  As it continues to cut down through the alluvium the fill terraces are left above the river channel (sometimes 100 m or more).  The fill terrace is only the very highest terrace resulting from the depositional episode; if there are multiple terraces below the fill terrace, these are called "cut terraces".

Cut terraces: Cut terraces, also called "cut-in-fill" terraces, are similar to the fill terraces mentioned above, but they are erosional in origin. Once the alluvium deposited in the valley has begun to erode and fill terraces form along the valley walls, cut terraces may also form below the fill terraces. As either a stream or river continues to incise into the material, multiple levels of terraces may form.  The uppermost being the fill terraces and the remaining lower terraces are cut terraces.

Nested fill terraces: Nested fill terraces are the result of the valley filling with alluvium, the alluvium being incised, and the valley filling again with material but to a lower level than before.  The terrace that results for the second filling is a nested terrace because it has been “nested” into the original alluvium and created a terrace. These terraces are depositional in origin and may be able to be identified by a sudden change in alluvium characteristics such as finer material.

Strath terraces: Strath terraces are the result of either a stream or river downcutting through bedrock.  As the flow continues to downcut, a period of valley widening may occur and expand the valley width.  This may occur due to an equilibrium reached in the fluvial system resulting from: slowed or paused uplift, climate change, or a change in the bedrock type.  Once downcutting continues the flattened valley bottom composed of bedrock (overlain with a possible thin layer of alluvium) is left above either a stream or river channel.  These bedrock terraces are the strath terraces and are erosional in nature.

Paired and unpaired terraces: Terraces of the same elevation on opposite sides of either a stream or river are called paired terraces.  They occur when it downcuts evenly on both sides and terraces on one side of the river correspond in height with those on the other side.  Paired terraces are caused by river rejuvenation.  Unpaired terraces occur when either a stream or river encounters material on one side that resists erosion, leaving a single terrace with no corresponding terrace on the resistant side.

Applications

Fluvial terraces can be used to measure the rate at which either a stream or river is downcutting its valley.  Using various dating methods, an age can be determined for the deposition of the terrace.  Using the resulting date and the elevation above its current level, an approximate average rate of downcutting can be determined.

See also

References

Fluvial landforms
Riparian zone
Water and the environment